There is a body of films that feature the deaf and hard of hearing. The Encyclopedia of Film Themes, Settings and Series wrote, "The world of the deaf has received little attention in film. Like blindness... it has been misused as a plot gimmick in syrupy romances." Miriam Nathan Lerner, writing in M/C Journal: A Journal of Media and Cultures, said that films featuring deaf and hard of hearing characters rarely focus on deafness itself but rather use it to advance the story or to help understand hearing characters. She said, "Films shape and reflect cultural attitudes and can serve as a potent force in influencing the attitudes and assumptions of those members of the hearing world who have had few, if any, encounters with deaf people." She identified various classifications behind the representation of deafness in film: deafness as a plot device, as a metaphor, as a symbolic commentary on society, or as a psychosomatic response to trauma; deaf characters as protagonist informants or as parallels to the protagonist, et cetera.

The following films were directed by deaf directors: Deafula (1975), Lake Windfall (2013), No Ordinary Hero: The SuperDeafy Movie (2013), See What I'm Saying: The Deaf Entertainers Documentary (2009) and Sign Gene: The First Deaf Superheroes (2017).

List of films

See also
These films feature characters who pretend to be deaf or hard of hearing:

One Flew Over the Cuckoo's Nest (1975), an American comedy-drama film based on the 1962 novel of the same name which is set in a mental institution and features a Native American side character who is believed to be a deafmute, until revealed otherwise.
What the Deaf Man Heard (1997), an American television film set in the U.S. state of Georgia in 1945 in which the hearing protagonist lives in a town for 20 years pretending to be deaf.

References

Bibliography

External links
Making Room for the Deaf in Hollywood at The New York Times
Can hearing directors make deaf films? at The Guardian

Deaf and hard of hearing, list of films featuring the
Films featuring the deaf and hard of hearing, list of
 
Films